Sadak 2 is a 2020 Indian Hindi-language action thriller road film directed by Mahesh Bhatt and produced by Fox Star Studios and Mukesh Bhatt under their banner Vishesh Films. A sequel to the 1991 film Sadak, it stars Sanjay Dutt (reprising his role from the original) alongside Alia Bhatt and Aditya Roy Kapur in the lead roles. Jisshu Sengupta, Gulshan Grover, Makrand Deshpande, Priyanka Bose and others play supporting roles, while Pooja Bhatt makes a special appearance. The film marks Mahesh Bhatt's return as a director after 20 years. The film's story takes place twenty-nine years after the events of its predecessor.

The film's trailer was released on 12 August 2020 on YouTube, and within a week, it became the second most-disliked video and the most-disliked film teaser/trailer on the platform due to internet users protesting nepotism in  Bollywood after the death of Sushant Singh Rajput.

Sadak 2 was released on 28 August 2020 on the streaming platform Disney+ Hotstar in India and in U.S. theaters by Gravitas Ventures. The film was panned by critics, with criticism for its performance, script, dialogues and use of clichés.

Plot
Aarya Desai (Alia Bhatt) vandalises a placard of Guru Gyaan Prakash (Makarand Deshpande). She is stopped by her step-mother Nandini and father Yogesh and Gyaan Prakash's ashram people. Ravi Kishore Verma (Sanjay Dutt), now an elderly man has recently lost his love and wife, Pooja (Pooja Bhatt). He attempts suicide and gets hospitalised. Ravi refuses when the doctor asks him to admit himself in a mental rehab. Aarya runs away, and enters Ravi's home, stating she'd booked Kailash 3 months before.

Aarya convinces Ravi to visit Kailash for Pooja's sake and gives a letter with her handwriting. Ravi agrees. Nandini and Yogesh go to Gyaan Prakash with Commissioner Rajesh Puri. Gyaan Prakash says Aarya will die by her own blood. 
Aarya tells Ravi about her mission to stop Guru Gyaan Prakash and all other fake gurus. In past Nandini killed Aarya's mother Shakuntala, married Yogesh and begun using their wealth to run Gyaan Prakash's ashram.

Aarya recounts meeting Vishal and initially fighting with him but reconciling and falling in love over a seminar exposing fake gurus. After her home is vandalised, they go into hiding. They're asked to visit someone who has proof against the gurus. However, it turns out as an ambush, and Vishal kills the hitman in self-defense. Ravi picks him up from jail. Yogesh and Nandini find Vishal and Aarya's reunion in security footage. Aarya and Vishal are cornered by gangster Dilip Hathkaaka.

Ravi arrives and saves them. Vishal confesses his real name is Munna Chavan, saying he came to Mumbai to win a reality show but ended up becoming a drug addict. Guru Gyaan Prakash's men helped and sent him to pretend to be in love with and kill Aarya. However, upon attending her seminars, he started questioning his own belief. Ravi takes them to John's house. It is revealed that Yogesh had planned Shakuntala's death, and now he kills Nandini.

In the end, Ravi kills Yogesh and Gyaan Prakash, dies and imagines Pooja calling out to him. Aarya performs his last rites, and has also won her battle against fake gurus.

Cast
 Sanjay Dutt as Ravi Kishore Verma
 Alia Bhatt as Aarya Desai
 Aditya Roy Kapur as Vishal Agnihotri 
 Jisshu Sengupta as Yogesh Desai
 Gulshan Grover as Dilip Hathkaatha
 Makarand Deshpande as Guru Gyaanprakash
 Priyanka Bose as Nandini Desai
 Mohan Kapoor as Commissioner Rajesh Puri
 Akshay Anand as John
 Javed Khan Amrohi as Pakya
 Akash Khurana as Psychiatrist
 Himanshu Bhatt as Gaurav
 Digvijay Purohit as Sunil
 Anil George as Om
 Jahangir Karkaria as Dr. Rajshekhar Dastur
 Babrak Akbari as Killer
 Soni Arora as Shakuntala Desai
 Abdul Quadir Amin
 Sangeetha V
 Vaibhav Choudhary as Divyansh
 Pooja Bhatt as Pooja Verma (special appearance)

Production

Development 
In April 2017, media reports surfaced about the sequel of the 1991 film Sadak, after its lead cast Sanjay Dutt and Pooja Bhatt visited Mukesh Bhatt through the office of Vishesh Films. The source further claimed that it will feature a different plot, despite being the continuation of the original and the script will be a remake of the Tamil film Mahanadhi (1994), which will be directed by Srijit Mukherji. However, no developments about the film took place, despite its initial announcement.

On 20 September 2018, coinciding with Mahesh Bhatt's 70th birthday, Alia Bhatt announced the film officially with the title Sadak 2, with the original film's cast members, along with Alia and Aditya Roy Kapur was announced being a part of the cast. The film marked Mahesh Bhatt's return to direction after 20 years since his last film Zakhm as a director, and also marked the maiden collaboration with Alia and Mahesh working together.

Filming 
On 8 April 2019, it was confirmed that principal photography would commence in the middle of May 2019, which eventually began on 18 May 2019. The following day, Makarand Deshpande was confirmed to play the main antagonist in the film. Alia Bhatt joined the film on 21 May 2019. The first schedule of the film was completed in the third week of May in Mumbai and the second schedule began in Ooty in mid-July 2019. With a few sequences being shot in Mysore and Ooty, the film's principal photography wrapped up on 31 October 2019, except for a few patchwork scenes which were filmed in July 2020, despite the COVID-19 pandemic.

Soundtrack 

The music for the film was composed by Jeet Gannguli, Ankit Tiwari, Samidh Mukerjee, Urvi and Suniljeet while the lyrics written by Rashmi Virag, Vijay Vijawatt, Shabbir Ahmed, Suniljeet and Shalu Vaish. The film score is composed by Sandeep Chowta.

Controversies

Nepotism debate 
Sadak 2s trailer was released on August 12, 2020, and faced vote brigading owing to the nepotism debate sparked after the death of Indian actor Sushant Singh Rajput. Rajput was initially considered to play the lead role opposite Alia Bhatt, but later he was opted out of this film. Speculating that Rajput had been upset over being shut out of the film industry, due to hiring practises that favoured children of established film personalities, Rajput's fans blamed notable people in Bollywood, including Sadak 2 director Mahesh Bhatt and his daughter Alia. Within two days of its release, the trailer had received 5.3 million dislikes on YouTube and became the second most disliked video within a week's time. As of 25 December 2021, the trailer has received 13.8 million dislikes.

Hurting Hindu sentiments 
In July 2020, a resident of Bihar filed a complaint against the makers of the film, stating that the film's poster featured an image of Kailash Mansarovar, which "hurt Hindu sentiments". The Vishva Hindu Parishad also criticised the film's trailer for similar reasons.

Release 
In October 2019, Gravitas Ventures bought the United States distribution rights for the feature. The film was initially scheduled for release on 25 March 2020 in India and in United States on 24 April 2020, but was pushed to 10 July 2020 in India and 31 July 2020 in the United States due to the outbreak of COVID-19. It was again pulled from the release schedule as the shooting was delayed because of the COVID-19 pandemic lockdown in India.

On 29 June 2020, the streaming service Disney+ Hotstar conducted a virtual press conference, where Bhatt announced that the film would be released exclusively on Disney+ Hotstar. The film premiered on 28 August 2020 in India and in theaters in United States.

Critical reception 
Sadak 2 was panned by critics. Anna M. M. Vetticad of Firstpost gave the film 0.25 out of 5, calling it the director's interpretation of a "sleeping pill", and wrote "It is not possible to be angry with Sadak 2 for its half-baked ideas and quarter-baked script though, because it is too boring to be worthy of even anger." Calling it "One of 2020's worst films", Jyoti Sharma Bawa of Hindustan Times wrote that Sadak 2 is a "jaded and ponderous film that is stuck in the 90's, [which] is best avoided." Shubhra Gupta of The Indian Express gave the film 1 out of 5, calling it "terrible" and wondered "why would anyone want to make something so dated, so jaded, in this day and age?" Rahul Desai of Film Companion called the film "dreadful" and "atrocious", and bemoaned that the performances of the actors "sticks out like a sore thumb." Anupama Chopra of Film Companion wrote, "The storytelling, performances dialogue, cinematography, songs, background music – all seem to belong to the 90's".

References

External links
 
 

Indian sequel films
Indian direct-to-video films
Indian action thriller films
Films shot in Ooty
Disney+ Hotstar original films
2020s Hindi-language films
2020 direct-to-video films
2020 action thriller films
Fox Star Studios films
Films directed by Mahesh Bhatt
Advertising and marketing controversies in film
Film controversies in India
Films scored by Jeet Ganguly
Films scored by Samidh Mukherjee
Films scored by Ankit Tiwari